The 2012 Tevlin Women's Challenger was a professional tennis tournament played on indoor hard courts. It was the 8th edition of the tournament and part of the 2012 ITF Women's Circuit, offering a total of $50,000 in prize money. It took place in Toronto, Ontario, Canada between October 29 and November 4, 2012.

Singles main-draw entrants

Seeds

1 Rankings are as of October 22, 2012

Other entrants
The following players received wildcards into the singles main draw:
 Françoise Abanda
 Gloria Liang
 Rebecca Marino
 Erin Routliffe

The following players received entry from the qualifying draw:
 Sherazad Benamar
 Elisabeth Fournier
 Sonja Molnar
 Carol Zhao

Champions

Singles

 Eugenie Bouchard def.  Sharon Fichman, 6–1, 6–2

Doubles

 Gabriela Dabrowski /  Alla Kudryavtseva def.  Eugenie Bouchard /  Jessica Pegula, 6–2, 7–6(7–2)

External links
Official website

Tevlin Women's Challenger
Tevlin Women's Challenger
Tevlin Women's Challenger
Tevlin Women's Challenger
Tevlin Women's Challenger